is a carbonaceous asteroid and binary system, classified as near-Earth object and potentially hazardous asteroid of the Apollo group, approximately  in diameter. The primary has a spheroidal shape.

It was discovered on 24 March 1996, by Australian astronomer Robert McNaught at Siding Spring Observatory in New South Wales, Australia. The asteroid was a target of NASA's Janus Serenity space probe, until the delay of the rocket launch made the target inaccessible. In 2017, scientists from the Chinese Academy of Sciences' Purple Mountain Observatory revealed a plan to land a probe on this asteroid in 2029, as part of an asteroid exploration mission.

Numbering and naming 

This minor planet was numbered by the Minor Planet Center on 21 February 2008. As of 2021, it has not been named.

Orbit and classification 
 orbits the Sun at a distance of 0.7–1.4 AU once every 1 years and 1 month (395 days; semi-major axis of 1.05 AU). Its orbit has an eccentricity of 0.35 and an inclination of 2° with respect to the ecliptic. In 2019 a precovery observation from Palomar Mountain was found, extending the body's observation arc into 1985.

Physical characteristics 
The carbonaceous body is characterized as a rare B-type and hydrated C-type (Ch) asteroid, respectively.

Lightcurves 
Several rotational lightcurves of this asteroid were obtained from photometric observations taken by astronomers Petr Pravec, Petr Scheirich and Stefano Mottola, as well as by the Very Large Telescope VISR instrument. Lightcurve analysis gave a well-defined rotation period of 3.594 to 3.595 hours with a brightness variation of 0.08 to 0.10 magnitude. The asteroid is an oblate ellipsoid with a nearly spherical shape.

Diameter and albedo 
According to numerous observations, including the EXPLORENEOs survey, NASA's Wide-field Infrared Survey Explorer with its subsequent NEOWISE mission and the Spitzer Space Telescope, the asteroid measures between 1.55 and 1.90 kilometers in diameter and its surface has a low albedo of 0.03 to 0.05. The Collaborative Asteroid Lightcurve Link adopts an albedo of 0.04 and a diameter of 1.90 kilometers.

Satellite 

During the photometric observations in December 1998, the binary nature of this asteroid was revealed. It was the first binary near-Earth asteroid for which eclipse events were detected in the visible spectrum. The asteroid moon is known by its provisional designation S/1998 (175706) 1. It has a diameter of approximately 490 meters, an orbital period of 16.1508 hours, and a nearly circular orbit, with an eccentricity of 0.1 and a semi-major axis of approximately 3.4 primary radii. The orbital period was later estimated to be around 16.15 hours.

Exploration

Rejected Marco Polo mission 

Due to its binary nature and its low delta-v heliocentric orbit (also see Hohmann transfer orbit), this asteroid was selected for MarcoPolo-R, which was the Marco Polo spacecraft first proposed mission. MarcoPolo-R was originally selected for the assessment study phase in the M3 slot of ESA's Cosmic Vision program, but rejected in favor of PLATO by the end of 2012.

Janus spacecraft

Planned Chinese mission 

In 2017, Chinese scientists announced they plan to land a probe on  after 2029 as part of its asteroid exploration mission. The probe is also expected to conduct a fly-by of a third asteroid to be determined at a later time. The entire mission is expected to take about six years.

See also 
 (35107) 1991 VH, binary near-Earth asteroid and former target of the Janus Mayhem mission, until the launch delay made the target inaccessible

References

External links 

 Asteroids with Satellites, Robert Johnston, johnstonsarchive.net
 Asteroid (175706) 1996 FG3, Small Bodies Data Ferret
 List of the Potentially Hazardous Asteroids (PHAs), Minor Planet Center
 Asteroid Lightcurve Database (LCDB), query form (info )
 Dictionary of Minor Planet Names, Google books
 
 
 

175706
Discoveries by Robert H. McNaught
175706
175706
175706
19960324